Schultze reagent (also known as Chlor-Zinc-Iodine Solution) is an oxidizing mixture consisting of a saturated aqueous solution of potassium chlorate KClO3 and varying amounts of concentrated nitric acid HNO3. It is commonly used in palynologic macerations. It was invented by Max Schultze. It is used to determine whether a substance contains cellulose, by turning purple in its presence. It is corrosive and an environmental hazard.

References

Oxidizing mixtures